Silver Skies Blue is an album by Judy Collins and Ari Hest. It earned them a Grammy Award nomination for Best Folk Album, Hest's first and Collins' first nomination in 40 years. Of the album's 12 tracks, 8 were co-written by Collins and Hest.
  
Collins and Hest met backstage at a show, and Hest sang on one song on her  2014 Live In Ireland album, prior to collaborating on Silver Skies Blue.

Track listing

References

2016 albums
Judy Collins albums
Cleopatra Records albums